Melih Ekener (born 13 July 1965 in İstanbul) is a Turkish Albanian actor who usually appears in comedic roles.

Biography
Ekener started his professional acting career at the Kenter Theatre and later joined the Hadi Çaman Yeditepe Oyuncuları. He first appeared on television on TRT's Yarı Şaka Yarı Ciddi comedy show. Later he produced the shows Seç Bakalım, Parola, Kolaysa Sen de Gel and Dekolte'  shown on Kanal 6, ATV and Kanal D respectively.  He made his film debut in  Ferdi Eğilmez's reboot of the Hababam Sinifi'' series as Bebe Ruhi.

Currently he is the manager of the Christian satellite television SAT-7 TÜRK.

References

External links

1965 births
Male actors from Istanbul
Turkish comedians
Turkish male film actors
Turkish male stage actors
Turkish male television actors
Living people
Television people from Istanbul